Gleb Khor (born 8 April 1963, Bilytske, Dobropillia) is a Russian political figure and deputy of the 4th, 5th, 6th, 7th, and 8th State Dumas. 

From 1982 to 1993, he worked in the coal mining industry. Later he continued his career in various investment companies, including Heopolis, Pharaon, Intrastkom. In 2003, he was elected deputy of the 4th State Duma from the Saratov Oblast constituency. Khor was re-elected in 2007, 2011, 2016, and 2021 for the 5th, 6th, 7th, and 8th State Dumas, respectively.

Awards 
 Order of Friendship
 Russian Federation Presidential Certificate of Honour

References

1963 births
Living people
United Russia politicians
21st-century Russian politicians
Eighth convocation members of the State Duma (Russian Federation)
Seventh convocation members of the State Duma (Russian Federation)
Sixth convocation members of the State Duma (Russian Federation)
Fifth convocation members of the State Duma (Russian Federation)
Fourth convocation members of the State Duma (Russian Federation)
People from Donetsk Oblast
Moscow State Mining University alumni